This is a list of Azerbaijan football transfers in the summer transfer window, 9 June - 31 August 2017, by club. Only clubs of the 2017–18 Azerbaijan Premier League are included.

Azerbaijan Premier League 2017-18

Gabala

In:

Out:

Inter Baku

In:

Out:

Kapaz

In:

Out:

Neftchi Baku

In:

Out:

Qarabağ

In:

Out:

Sabail

In:

Out:

Sumgayit

In:

Out:

Zira 

In:

Out:

References

Azerbaijan
Azerbaijani football transfer lists
2017–18 in Azerbaijani football